Atinder Pal Singh is an Indian politician. He was elected to the Lok Sabha, lower house of the Parliament of India as an Independent.

References

External links
Official biographical sketch in Parliament of India website

India MPs 1989–1991
Lok Sabha members from Punjab, India
1957 births
Living people